Kharmenj (also Romanized as Khar Menj; also known as Faz̤elābād and Kharmin) is a village in Karghond Rural District, Nimbeluk District, Qaen County, South Khorasan Province, Iran. At the 2006 census, its population was 318, in 98 families.

References 

Populated places in Qaen County